Friedrich von Arnauld de la Perière (17 June 1888 in Breslau – 12 October 1969 in Friedrichshafen) was a German aviator and Generalleutnant of the Luftwaffe.

He dropped the first bombs on England in World War I.

Websites
http://www.balsi.de/Homepage-Generale/Luftwaffe/A/Arnauld-de-la-Periere-Friedrich-von.htm 
https://archive.today/20130209191352/http://ww2gravestone.com/general/arnauld-de-la-peri%C3%A8re-friedrich-von

1888 births
1969 deaths
Imperial German Navy personnel of World War I
Reichsmarine personnel
German World War I pilots
Lieutenant generals of the Luftwaffe
German people of French descent